Disengage is the third album by American industrial rock band Circle of Dust, released in 1998. This is their final piece of material before entering an eighteen year hiatus.

History
Klayton began to work on the album soon after a brief departure from Angeldust, a music/magic project he and Criss Angel collaborated on together. After Circle of Dust's contract with R.E.X. expired, Klayton took the project to Flying Tart Records. Seven remixes for "Chasm" and "Refractor" were produced. Klayton intended to release the remixes on a single separate CD entitled Circle of Dust – Refractor/Chasm Remixes; however, this attempt was shot down by the label and were instead inserted into the album. After completing Disengage and disbanding Circle of Dust, Klayton went on to work on his next project, Celldweller.

Track listing

References

Circle of Dust albums
1998 albums
R.E.X. Records albums